Lachlan McMillan (1900–1983) was a Scottish footballer who played as an inside left, mainly for Hamilton Academical and Heart of Midlothian.

He made more than 300 appearances in the Scottish Football League's top division across 14 seasons but won no major honours (he won the minor Lanarkshire Cup, Rosebery Charity Cup, Dunedin Cup, East of Scotland Shield and Wilson Cup with his two main clubs, and played on the losing side in the Glasgow Cup final of 1932, while on loan to Partick Thistle). He scored a hat-trick on his Hearts debut in the Wilson Cup final of 1924, an Edinburgh Derby victory over Hibernian.

The closest he came to any representative honours was an appearance in an SFL XI trial in 1925.

As his playing career came to an end, McMillan had a spell at Elgin City (then members of the Highland League) as player-manager, winning the Scottish Qualifying Cup in 1935, and later served in the Royal Air Force during World War II.

References

1900 births
Date of birth missing
1983 deaths
Date of death missing
Footballers from Hamilton, South Lanarkshire
Association football inside forwards
Scottish footballers
Larkhall Thistle F.C. players
Petershill F.C. players
Rutherglen Glencairn F.C. players
Hamilton Academical F.C. players
Aberdeen F.C. players
Partick Thistle F.C. players
Royal Albert F.C. players
Elgin City F.C. players
Royal Air Force personnel of World War II
Heart of Midlothian F.C. players
Third Lanark A.C. players
Scottish Junior Football Association players
Scottish Football League players
Highland Football League players
Scottish football managers
Association football player-managers
Elgin City F.C. managers
Highland Football League managers
Armadale Thistle F.C. non-playing staff